Export Promotion Bureau (EPB) is a Bangladesh government agency located within the Ministry of Commerce. It is responsible for developing the nation's export industry. It does not include import data

Establishment 
It traces its origin to the Export Promotion organization formed when Bangladesh was still East Pakistan in 1962. Initial proclamations were made on August 20 and November 8, 1975. The Export Promotion Bureau Ordinance was enacted in 1977 and consequently EPB was established.

Structure 
EPB headquarter is in Dhaka, with regional offices in Chittagong, Khulna and Rajshahi.
In addition, there are branch offices in Sylhet, Comilla and Narayangonj.

The EPB consists of multiple divisions:

 Policy and Planning Division
 Commodities Development Division
 Information Division
 Fairs and Display Division
 Administration and Finance Division
 Textile Division
 Statistics and Research Division
 Information and Communications Technology Division

References

External links 
 
 
 
 

Export promotion agencies
Foreign trade of Bangladesh
1975 establishments in Bangladesh